A Kind of America is a Hungarian comedy film from 2002.

Plot 
The film is situated in Budapest, where the brothers Ákos, András, and Tamás live. Tamás is a director of video clips and commercials, but dreams of directing a feature film. He has written a script with the title 'The Guilty City', but has trouble financing the project. At his surprise, he receives an email from an American film producer named Alex Brubeck, who writes that he likes the script. Offering to pay half the budget, he wants to meet Tamás personally in Budapest to talk things through. With the help of his brothers Ákos, a successful manager and sex addict, and András, a failed poet, he does everything to impress the American producer.

External links
 

Hungarian comedy films
2002 films
Films set in Budapest